Ankutia is a village of Chatmohar Upazila of Pabna District in the Division of Rajshahi, Bangladesh.

Demographics
According to the 2011 Bangladesh census, Ankutia had 510 households and a population of 1,874. The literacy rate (age 7 and over) was 49.7%, compared to the national average of 51.8%.

See also
Upazilas of Bangladesh
Districts of Bangladesh
Divisions of Bangladesh

References

Populated places in Pabna District